Momase Region is one of four regions of Papua New Guinea. Its largest city is Lae, the second city of the nation. The name Momase is a portmanteau of the constituent provinces, Morobe, Madang and Sepik (East and West). Momase is by far the most linguistically diverse region of Papua New Guinea.

Subdivision
The Region is administratively divided into four provinces:
East Sepik
Madang
Morobe
Sandaun (West Sepik)

See also
 Provinces of Papua New Guinea

References

 
Regions of Papua New Guinea